Volkovo is a rural locality (a village) in Spasskoye Rural Settlement, Vologodsky District, Vologda Oblast, Russia. The population was 11 as of 2002.

Geography 
The distance to Vologda is 29 km, to Nepotyagovo is 19 km.

References 

Rural localities in Vologodsky District